The Ross Trails Adena Circle is an archaeological site in the southwestern part of the U.S. state of Ohio.  Located northwest of Ross in Butler County, it appears to have been a sacred circle constructed by people of the Adena culture.

Its interior, which is slightly raised above the surrounding terrain, can be accessed through a small opening in the wall that appears to have housed a gate at one time. Because the circle has never been excavated, its contents and uses are uncertain; however, archaeologists have speculated that postholes or other evidence of a house or similar structure may be contained within the circle.

In 1975, the circle's archaeological value was recognized when it was added to the National Register of Historic Places.

References

Adena culture
Archaeological sites in Ohio
National Register of Historic Places in Butler County, Ohio
Archaeological sites on the National Register of Historic Places in Ohio